South Golden Beach is a coastal town in New South Wales, Australia in Byron Shire. It is off the Pacific Highway, close to Byron Bay, Ocean Shores, Billinudgel and the Queensland border. To the north of South Golden beach is Pottsville, and Brunswick heads to the south.

There is no service (fuel) station in the town, only a single takeaway food shop, and a community centre hall which is managed by volunteers under Council delegation. More amenities and services can be found in neighbouring towns of New Brighton and Ocean Shores.

Notes and references

Towns in New South Wales
Beaches of New South Wales
Northern Rivers
Byron Shire